The Hanifi Rohingya script is a unified script for the Rohingya language. Rohingya was first written in the 19th century with a version of the Perso-Arabic script. In 1975, an orthographic Arabic script was developed, based on the Urdu alphabet.

In the 1980s, Mohammad Hanif and his colleagues created the suitable phonetic script based on Arabic letters; it has been compared to the N’ko script. The script also includes a set of decimal numbers.

Characters

Alphabet and pronunciation

Consonants

Vowels

Numerals

Unicode 

The Hanifi Rohingya script was added to the Unicode Standard in June 2018 with the release of version 11.0. Proposals to include it in Unicode were written by linguist Anshuman Pandey.

The Unicode block for Hanifi Rohingya is U+10D00–U+10D3F and contains 50 characters:

Fonts
Google's Noto Sans has developed a Rohingya script font called Noto Sans Hanifi Rohingya, available at GitHub.

Rohingya keyboard

A virtual keyboard was developed by Google for the Rohingya language in 2019 and allows users to type in the Rohingya script. The Rohingya Unicode keyboard layout can be found here.

References 

Rohingya people
Alphabets
Writing systems of Asia
Writing systems introduced in 1980
Arabic script

Right-to-left writing systems